René Sibomana served as the General Commissioner of the Association des Scouts du Rwanda.
In 1990, he was awarded the 211th Bronze Wolf, the only distinction of the World Organization of the Scout Movement, awarded by the World Scout Committee for exceptional services to world Scouting.

References

External links

Recipients of the Bronze Wolf Award
Year of birth missing
Scouting and Guiding in Rwanda